Matthew Lee (born September 9, 1965) is an American journalist and diplomatic writer for the Associated Press (AP). Previously, he worked for Agence France-Presse (AFP), The Daily Progress and The Washington Post.

Lee graduated from Georgetown University's School of Foreign Service with a Bachelor of Arts degree in foreign affairs in 1989. After college, he started working at The Washington Post as a news aide, a job he said in a 2019 interview started his interest in journalism. He then proceeded to move to Charlottesville, Virginia to work for The Daily Progress as a local news reporter. In 1994, Lee moved to Cambodia and worked as a freelance reporter for The Cambodia Daily and several international news outlets. In 1995, he joined Agence France-Presse and became their Phnom Penh bureau chief. On June 17, 1997, while covering a firefight in Phnom Penh between gunmen aligned respectively to the two co-rulers of Cambodia, Lee was wounded by shrapnel. From 1999 to 2005, Lee covered the United States Department of State for AFP, before becoming deputy bureau chief of AFP's East Africa bureau in Nairobi, Kenya. In 2007, he moved back to Washington D.C. and started covering the U.S. State Department for the Associated Press.

As the State Department reporter for the Associated Press, Lee has been noted on multiple occasions as unusually assertive in exchanges with State Department Spokespersons Victoria Nuland, Jen Psaki, Heather Nauert, and Ned Price. Lee's February 2022 exchange with Price was cited by Nathan J. Robinson of Current Affairs in an article reiterating the importance of an adversarial press.

References

External links 
 
 

Associated Press reporters
Living people
1965 births
Walsh School of Foreign Service alumni